Dunloe Ogham Stones (CIIC 197–203, 241) is a collection of ogham stones forming a National Monument located in County Kerry, Ireland.

Location

Dunloe Ogham Stones are located 1 km south of Beaufort, to the south of the River Laune.

History

The stones were carved in the 5th and 6th centuries AD and served as burial markers. Seven were discovered in 1838 forming the ceiling of a souterrain near Dunloe Castle and were moved to their current site by 1945.
Another stone comes from the old church of Kilbonane.

Description

The Kilbonane stone is in the centre (CIIC 241) and the others are arranged around it.

CIIC 197: DEGO{S} MAQI MOCOI TOICAKI ("of Daig son of the descendant of Toicacas"; believed to refer to the Tóecraige tribe)
CIIC 198: MAQI-RITEAS MAQI MAQI-DDUMILEAS/ MUCOI TOICACI ("of Mac-Rithe son of Mac-Duimle descendant of Toicacas"; believed to refer to the Tóecraige tribe)
CIIC 199: CUNACENA ("of Conchenn"; the name means "dog-head")
CIIC 200: MAQI-TTAL MAQI VORGOS MA/QI MU/COI TOICAC ("of Mac-Táil son of Fuirg descendant of Toicacas"; believed to refer to the Tóecraige tribe)
 
CIIC 201:  ... ṂC̣ ... G̣Ẹ?̣ ... / Ṃ[A(?)]Q̣ ... Ḍ/ ... Ẹ?̣ ...  (badly faded)
CIIC 202: NIỌTTVRẸCC MAQỊ/ ... G̣NỊ ("of Nad-Froích son of ?-án"; Nad-Froích means "heather's champion")
CIIC 203: MAQI-DECEDA MAQ̣[I] ("of Mac-Deichet son of..."; believed to refer to the Tóecraige tribe)
CIIC 241: B[AID(?)]AGNỊ ṂAQ̣I ADDỊLONA; NAGỤN[I(?)] M[U(?)]C̣[O(?)] B[AI(?)]D[A]N[I(?)]; NIR[???]MṆ[I]DAGNIESSICONIDDALA/ AMIT BAIDAGNI

References

National Monuments in County Kerry
Ogham inscriptions
5th-century inscriptions
6th-century inscriptions